Chestnut Grove is an unincorporated community in Albemarle County, Virginia.

References
http://geonames.usgs.gov

Unincorporated communities in Virginia
Unincorporated communities in Albemarle County, Virginia